Aquivaldo Mosquera Romaña (born 22 June 1981) is a Colombian former professional footballer. He also holds Mexican citizenship.

Club career
Mosquera made his debut in 2000 playing for Atlético Nacional. He would make over 150 appearances for the club before moving to  Pachuca of Mexico in 2005. With Pachuca, he won two league titles (Clausura 2006 and 2007), a CONCACAF Champions' Cup in 2007, and a Copa Sudamericana in 2006. In the summer of 2007 Mosquera transferred to Sevilla FC of La Liga. Though he would stay with the club until 2009, Mosquera only managed to appear in 41 league matches.

In 2009 Mosquera returned to Mexico, this time to play for Club América for a reported USD$6 million. Mosquera made his unofficial debut with América on 15 July 2009 in a 0–0 friendly against MLS club Colorado Rapids. He made his official league debut in a 1–1 draw against San Luis.

Mosquera, acting as club captain, won his first league title with América against Cruz Azul on 26 May 2013. He scored the first goal in the 2–1 second-leg win, with the club eventually winning the championship 4–2 on penalties.

On 4 June 2014, Mosquera was transferred to Pachuca, during the Mexican draft apertura 2014.

International career
Mosquera has been called up to the Colombia national team on several occasions, including for the 2010 World Cup qualifiers and for various friendlies. He was the captain for the team during the first half of the World Cup qualifiers.

Honours

Club
Atlético Nacional
Categoría Primera A: 2005-I
Pachuca
Liga MX: Clausura 2006, Clausura 2007, Clausura 2016
CONCACAF Champions' Cup: 2007
Copa Sudamericana: 2006
Sevilla
Spanish Super Cup: 2007
América
Liga MX: Clausura 2013

Individual
Mexican Balón de Oro (1): 2007

References

External links
 
 Career stats

1981 births
Living people
People from Apartadó
Colombian footballers
Colombia international footballers
Colombian expatriate footballers
Colombian emigrants to Mexico
Naturalized citizens of Mexico
Association football defenders
Atlético Nacional footballers
C.F. Pachuca players
Sevilla FC players
Club América footballers
Deportivo Cali footballers
Chiapas F.C. footballers
Categoría Primera A players
La Liga players
Liga MX players
Expatriate footballers in Mexico
Expatriate footballers in Spain
2011 Copa América players
Colombian people of African descent
Sportspeople from Antioquia Department
Cúcuta Deportivo managers